Rhomboidederes iuba is a species of beetle in the family Cerambycidae. It was described by Galileo and Martins in 2010.

References

Elaphidiini
Beetles described in 2010